Seryda is a genus of moths of the family Zygaenidae.

Species
 Seryda anacreon (Druce, 1884)
 Seryda basirei (Druce, 1896)
 Seryda cincta Walker, 1856
 Seryda confusa Tarmann & Drouet, 2015
 Seryda constans (H. Edwards, 1881)
 Seryda gallardi Tarmann & Drouet, 2015
 Seryda thyana (Druce, 1884)

References
 Seryda at funet.fi

Procridinae
Zygaenidae genera